Adam Kerinaiua (born 17 June 1974) is a former Australian rules footballer who played with the Brisbane Bears in the Australian Football League (AFL).

Kerinaiua, a Tiwi Islander, was recruited from North Darwin in the Northern Territory Football League (NTFL). He played three of the final four rounds of the 1992 AFL season, aged just 18.  In all three games he didn't find much of the ball but kicked a goal against Geelong.

He was a member of the Indigenous All-Stars team which defeated Collingwood in an exhibition match in 1994.

References

External links
 
 

1974 births
Indigenous Australian players of Australian rules football
Australian rules footballers from the Northern Territory
Brisbane Bears players
Palmerston Football Club players
Living people
Tiwi Islands people
St Mary's Football Club (NTFL) players